Breton Island may refer to: 
Breton Island (Antarctica)
Breton Island (Louisiana) in the Gulf of Mexico
Cape Breton Island in Nova Scotia, Canada
The Breton Islands near Quadra Island, British Columbia, Canada